DubVision is a Dutch DJ duo from The Hague consisting of brothers Victor (born 1989) and Stephan Leicher (born 1981) signed to the labels Spinnin' Records, Armada Music and Axtone.

Biography 

Stephan and Victor's parents pressured the duo to learn to play an instrument during their childhood, so they learned to play the piano at age 7. They grew up in several countries, where they grew to appreciate musical influences from different cultures. At a later age, Victor began experimenting with electronic music, using different computer programs. After seeing his younger brother producing, Steve became interested, and the two decided to team up as a group.

In 2012, DubVision collaborated with Project 46 on the song "You & I", which they released on Spinnin' Records. That same year, they also made their debut on Axtone Records with their rendition of "Committed To Sparkle Motion" by Discopolis. They released "Redux" through Spinnin' to start off 2013, and, later that year, also made their debut on Doorn Records with their track "Into the Light", in which they collaborated with Sander van Doorn. In 2014, they released "Backlash" on Spinnin' Records, which marked their first Beatport #1 overall chart track. DubVision also performed at the 2014 edition of Tomorrowland for the first time in Belgium. They then remixed "Gold Skies" by Sander van Doorn and Martin Garrix for their next release on Spinnin' Records. They collaborated with Feenixpawl for "Destination", their sophomore track on Axtone, for their next release. For their final track of the year, they put out the single "Turn It Around," through Spinnin' Records as well.

In 2018, DubVision and Firebeatz formed the supergroup METAFO4R, performing for the first time together at EDC Las Vegas 2018.

Discography

Studio Albums

Extended plays

Singles

As lead artist

As METAFO4R (with Firebeatz)

Co Produced:

Remixes
2010
 C-Jay and Shylock — "Watch Closely" (DubVision Remix)
 Jon Kong — "Elevate" (DubVision Remix)

2011
 Glitter — "Tageskarte" (DubVision Remix)
 Derek Howell — "Stride" (DubVision Remix)
 Hyline and Jaybeetrax — "Disturb" (DubVision Remix)
 Eddie Middle-Line — "Sunset Feel" (DubVision Remix)
 DJ BeCha — "Goodbye" (DubVision Remix)

2012
 Dark Matters (featuring Jess Morgan) — "The Real You" (DubVision Remix)
 Syke 'n' Sugarstarr and Jay Sebag — "Like That Sound" (DubVision Remix)
 Derek Howell — "Stride" (DubVision Remix)
 Pascal & Pearce (featuring Juliet Harding) — "Disco Sun" (DubVision Remix)
 Discopolis — "Falling (Committed To Sparkle Motion)" (DubVision Remix)

2013
 Royaal & Venuto — "Summertime" (DubVision Remix)

2014
 Icona Pop — "Just Another Night" (DubVision Remix)
 Dimitri Vegas & Like Mike — "Chattahoochee" (DubVision Remix)
 Foster the People — "Coming of Age" (DubVision Remix)
 Sander van Doorn, Martin Garrix and DVBBS — "Gold Skies" (DubVision Remix)

2015
 Dirty South (featuring Sam Martin) — "Unbreakable" (DubVision Remix)

2016
 Nervo (featuring Harrison Miya) — "Bulletproof" (DubVision Remix)
 Kris Menace and Life Like — "Discopolis" (DubVision Remix)
 Fais (featuring Afrojack) — "Hey" (DubVision Remix)
 The Chainsmokers (featuring Charlee) — "Inside Out" (DubVision Remix)
 Axwell & Ingrosso — "Thinking About You" (DubVision Remix)

2017
 Martin Garrix and Dua Lipa — "Scared to Be Lonely" (DubVision Remix)
 Armin van Buuren and Garibay (featuring Olaf Blackwood) — "I Need You" (DubVision Remix)
 Afrojack and David Guetta (featuring Ester Dean) — "Another Life" (DubVision Remix)

2018
 Martin Garrix (featuring Khalid) — "Ocean" (DubVision Remix)

2019
 Syzz and Taku-Hero — "Be My Love" (DubVision Remix)
 Hardwell (featuring Trevor Guthrie) — "Summer Air" (DubVision Remix)
 Martin Garrix featuring Bonn — "No Sleep" (Dubvision Remix)

2020
 Afrojack featuring Ally Brooke — "All Night" (DubVision Remix)
 Tritonal and Brooke Williams — "Someone To Love You" (DubVision Remix)
 Martin Garrix (featuring John Martin) — "Higher Ground" (DubVision Remix)
 GATTÜSO & Disco Killerz - I'll Be The One (DubVision Remix)

2021
 Andrew Rayel — "Silver Lining" (DubVision Remix)
 Afrojack and David Guetta — "Hero" (DubVision Remix)
2022

Eir Aoi - "Heart" (DubVision Remix)
Frank Walker, Two Feet - "Day by Day" (DubVision Remix)
Martin Garrix & JVKE - "Hero" (DubVision Remix)

Notes

References 

2010 establishments in the Netherlands
Dutch musical duos
Electronic dance music duos
Musical groups established in 2010
Sibling musical duos
Spinnin' Records artists
Progressive house musicians
Dutch electronic musicians
Dutch house music groups
Revealed Recordings artists
Stmpd Rcrds artists